Lehr may refer to:

 Lehr (glassmaking), a kiln for annealing glass
 Lehr (surname)
 Lehr, North Dakota, U.S.
 Lehr Infantry Battalion of the Prussian and Imperial German Armies, 1819–1914
 Lehr Infantry Regiment of the German Army in World War I
 Lehr-Brigade (mot.) 900, a German Army brigade during World War II
 Panzer Lehr Division, a German armored division during World War II
 Lehr, a district of Ulm, Germany

See also 
 Lahr (disambiguation)
 Lehrer, a surname
 Lehrs, a surname
 Lerner (disambiguation)

pt:Lehr